Small TV is an EP released by UK band White Lies on 6 November 2013. It was released to support the group their tour at the time.

Track listing

References

External links 
White Lies Official Myspace

2013 EPs